Kauda Babar is a Pakistani politician who has been a Member of the Senate of Pakistan, since March 2018.
Advisor to CM Balochistan for Gwadar development Authority from January 2018 to March 2018.

Political career
Babar was elected to the Senate of Pakistan as an independent candidate on general seat from Balochistan in 2018 Pakistani Senate election. He took oath as Senator on 12 March 2018.

References

Living people
Members of the Senate of Pakistan
Year of birth missing (living people)